KEPH may refer to:

 Keph.fr A French transmedia siteweb belonging to David TRIVES
 Ephrata Municipal Airport (ICAO code KEPH)
 KEPH-LP, a low-power radio station (95.3 FM) licensed to serve Friendswood, Texas, United States
 KEPH (Utah), a defunct radio station in Ephraim, Utah, on 89.5 FM